Boats on the River is a 1946 picture book by Marjorie Flack and illustrated by Jay Hyde Barnum. The story is about the various boats that are on the river in a city. The book was a recipient of a 1947 Caldecott Honor for its illustrations.

References

1946 children's books
American picture books
Caldecott Honor-winning works